Carolyn Trench-Sandiford is a Belizean urban planner and politician who has served as Speaker of the country's Senate since December 2020.

Education
Trench-Sandiford was born in Belize City. She studied Physical Planning and Environmental Resource Management at the University of Technology, Jamaica and Law at the University of London. She undertook a Masters in Environmental Law and Management at Aberystwyth University in Wales with a scholarship from the Protected Areas Conservation Trust.

Career
Trench-Sandiford is an urban planner and is CEO of her own firm. She served as President of the Belize Planners Association from 2016 until December 2020. She was co-convenor of the Caribbean Planners Association, was recognised as a United Nations global evaluation expert and was named by The Planner as one of its "Women of Influence" in 2018. 

Trench-Sandiford was known as a "social advocate, speaking out for the constitutional rights of vulnerable and marginalized groupings of people and communities. and on domestic violence. On the anniversaries of Belize's independence in 2014 and 2016, she published articles called "Quo Vadis Belize? Where are we going Belize?" outlining her understanding of the country's needs to move forward.

Political career
Trench-Sandford is a member of the People's United Party and served as party chair from 2010 as well as one of its Deputy Leaders for a time. In 2006 she was nominated as a candidate for the party in both the Collet Division and Belize City Council. She was defeated by the UDP's Patrick Faber in both the 2008 and 2012 general elections.

Trench-Sandiford was selected and sworn in as President of the Senate on 11 December 2020.

Personal life
Trench-Sandiford is a Christian.

References

External links
 Political History with Carolyn Trench-Sandiford

Living people
Year of birth missing (living people)
People from Belize City
Alumni of the University of London
Alumni of Aberystwyth University
Urban planners
Women urban planners
People's United Party politicians
Belizean women in politics
Members of the Senate (Belize)
Chairs of upper houses
Women legislative speakers
21st-century women politicians